Piotr Hojka (born 12 June 1984) is a Polish rower. He competed at the 2008 and 2012 Summer Olympics.

References

1984 births
Living people
Polish male rowers
Olympic rowers of Poland
Rowers at the 2008 Summer Olympics
Rowers at the 2012 Summer Olympics
Sportspeople from Bydgoszcz
European Rowing Championships medalists